The 1991–92 Murray State Racers men's basketball team represented Murray State University during the 1991–92 NCAA Division I men's basketball season. The Racers, led by first-year head coach Scott Edgar, played their home games at Racer Arena in Murray, Kentucky as members of the Ohio Valley Conference. They finished the season 17–13, 11–3 in OVC play to win the OVC regular season championship. They defeated Eastern Kentucky to win the OVC tournament to advance to the NCAA tournament for the third consecutive season. As No. 14 seed in the Midwest region, the Racers were beaten by No. 3 seed Arkansas, 80–69.

Roster

Schedule and results

|-
!colspan=9 style=| Regular season

|-
!colspan=9 style=| Ohio Valley Conference tournament

|-
!colspan=9 style=| NCAA tournament

|-

Awards and honors
Popeye Jones – NCAA Rebounding Leader

References

Murray State Racers men's basketball seasons
Murray State
Murray State
Murray State
Murray State